The 1960 Florida Gators football team represented the University of Florida during the 1960 NCAA University Division football season. The season was Ray Graves' first of ten and one of his three most successful as the head coach of the Florida Gators football team.  Graves' 1960 Florida Gators finished with a 9–2 overall record a 5–1 record in the Southeastern Conference (SEC), placing second among the twelve SEC teams—their best-ever SEC finish to date.

Before the season
Graves was a former Tennessee Volunteers lineman and assistant under coach Robert Neyland, and became a long-time Georgia Tech Yellow Jackets defensive assistant for coach Bobby Dodd.  Graves' arrival in Gainesville heralded a change in the Gators' football outlook: no longer would the Gators espouse Bob Woodruff's conservative, ball control, "go for the tie" philosophy.

Schedule

Primary source: 2015 Florida Gators Football Media Guide

Attendance figures: University of Florida 1961 Football Brochure.

Postseason
The Gators capped their first-ever nine-win season with a hard-fought 13–12 victory over the twelfth-ranked Baylor Bears in the Gator Bowl on New Year's Eve 1960. In the Gator Bowl, the Gators defense halted a 75-yard drive by Baylor on the half-yard line in the first quarter, then set the stage for two second quarter touchdowns. Baylor dropped a pass for the two-point conversion and the win, and quarterback Libertore was voted game MVP.

References

Florida
Florida Gators football seasons
Gator Bowl champion seasons
Florida Gators football